Andrew Gravolet Loupe (born November 22, 1988) is an American professional golfer.

Biography
Loupe was born in Baton Rouge, Louisiana, where he attended Episcopal High School. He was a member of the school's golf team and won the Louisiana Junior Amateur Championship in 2005. He was also a two-time all-state guard in basketball and was named The Advocate High School Athlete of the Year as a junior in 2006. He played college golf at LSU and was a two-time All-American.

Loupe turned pro in 2011 and spent most of the next two seasons on the NGA Pro Golf Tour. He played his first PGA Tour event in 2011 when he qualified for the Zurich Classic of New Orleans; he went on to miss the cut. 

He played on the Web.com Tour in 2013, finishing 70th in the standings: he ranked second in driving distance with an average of 315.2 yards. He finished T-6 at the season-ending Web.com Tour Championship: this gave him a ranking of 23rd in the Finals rankings (excluding regular season Top 25) to earn his 2014 PGA Tour card. 

Loupe missed his first five cuts to start the 2014 season before shooting an eight-under-par 63 at Monterey Peninsula to take the first-round lead at the AT&T Pebble Beach National Pro-Am. He went on to finish T-27. After a T-12 finish in his next tournament, the Puerto Rico Open, he shot an opening-round 67 to lead the Valero Texas Open en route to a T-4 finish.  He finished the 2014 season in 137th place to earn conditional status for the 2015 season; he competed in the 2014 Web.com Tour Finals but was unable to improve his category.

In 2015, he finished 198th in the FedEx standings, but a win in one of the Web.com Tour Finals events earned him a return to the PGA Tour.

Professional wins (1)

Web.com Tour wins (1)

See also
2013 Web.com Tour Finals graduates
2015 Web.com Tour Finals graduates

References

External links

Profile on LSU's official athletic site

American male golfers
LSU Tigers golfers
PGA Tour golfers
Korn Ferry Tour graduates
Golfers from Louisiana
Sportspeople from Baton Rouge, Louisiana
1988 births
Living people